Francis George Broadbent (1909, Fulham, London – 13 January 1983, Wandsworth, London) was a 20th-century English architect known for his work in designing churches and schools for the Roman Catholic Church.

Career
Broadbent was a partner in the architectural firm Goodhart-Rendel Broadbent & Curtis in the 1950s and 1960s and took over the practice when Harry Stuart Goodhart-Rendel died. Subsequently, he became senior partner in Broadbent Hastings Reid & New, retiring in 1980.

Works
Broadbent completed the restoration work on Prinknash Abbey, which had been started by Goodhart-Rendel in 1939. He also restored Tyburn convent (1962). He worked, from 1959 to 1960, with Goodhart-Rendel on the design and construction of St Martin and St Ninian Catholic Church in Whithorn, Wigtownshire, Scotland.

The churches he designed include:
 Our Lady Queen of Peace Church, Richmond, London (1953–54)
 The Church of the Holy Name, Esher (1960)
 St Ann's, Kingston Hill (1960)
 St Thomas More, Knebworth (1961)
 The Holy Name, Claygate (1961)
St John Fisher, Cannon Hill Lane, Merton (1962)
 St John the Evangelist, Tadworth (1966) 
 The Holy Spirit, Fetcham
 St Pius X, New Malden
 St Theodore, Cranbrook 
 Our Lady of Dover, Buckland (1960s)

Personal life
Broadbent lived at 71 Christchurch Road, East Sheen.

Death and legacy
Broadbent died on 13  January 1983, aged 73.

His correspondence with Harry Stuart Goodhart-Rendel from 1941 to 1959 is held by the Royal Institute of British Architects in its Archives and Drawings Collection.

References

1909 births
1983 deaths
20th-century English architects
Architects from London
Architects of Roman Catholic churches
People from East Sheen
People from Fulham
People from Wandsworth